Iron shot may refer to:

Small round iron balls used as projectiles.
Simple weights used with balance scales.
Iron balls used in the sporting event shot put.